Vexillum bicatenatum is an extinct species of sea snail, a marine gastropod mollusk, in the family Costellariidae, the ribbed miters.

Distribution
Fossils of this marine species were found in Oligocene strata in Indonesia.

References

 Martin, K. 1935. Oligocaene Gastropoden von Buton. Leidsche Geologische Mededeelingen 7(1):111-118, pl. 2.

External links
 

bicatenatum
Gastropods described in 1865